Wellington Cepeda (born November 25, 1973) is a Dominican former professional baseball player and current coach. He played in minor league baseball as a right-handed pitcher from 1997 to 2000. He is the Bullpen Coach for the Miami Marlins of Major League Baseball (MLB).

Career
Cepeda began his career as a pitcher in the Arizona Diamondbacks organization. He spent 1997 with the AZL Diamondbacks, 1998 with the South Bend Silver Hawks, 1999 with the High Desert Mavericks, and spent his final season in 2000 back with South Bend.

Cepeda began his coaching career as the pitching coach for the Missoula Osprey in 2003 and 2004. He spent the 2005 though 2007 seasons as South Bend's pitching coach. Cepeda spent the 2008 and 2009 seasons as the pitching coach of the Visalia Oaks / Visalia Rawhide. He returned to South Bend as pitching coach for the 2010 through 2013 seasons. He spent the 2014 and 2015 seasons as the Mobile BayBears pitching coach. In 2019, Cepeda was the manager of the AZL Diamondbacks.

Miami Marlins
Cepeda was hired as the Miami Marlins bullpen coach following the 2019 season.

References

External links

1973 births
Living people
Arizona League Diamondbacks players
Baseball pitchers
Dominican Republic baseball coaches
Dominican Republic baseball players
Dominican Republic expatriate baseball players in the United States
Dominican Republic national baseball team people
High Desert Mavericks players
Major League Baseball bullpen coaches
Miami Marlins coaches
Minor league baseball coaches
Minor league baseball managers
People from La Vega Province
South Bend Silver Hawks players